The Immigration and Naturalisation Service, Dutch: Immigratie en Naturalisatiedienst (IND), is a Dutch government agency that handles the admission of foreigners in the Netherlands. It is part of the Ministry of Justice and Security. The IND processes all applications for asylum, family reunification, visas, naturalisation, and other residence permits.

On behalf of the Dutch Deputy Minister of Security and Justice (since 2022 Eric van der Burg) the IND implements the aliens policy, the aliens act (Dutch: 'Vreemdelingenwet') and the Netherlands nationality act (Dutch: 'Rijkswet op het Nederlanderschap').

External links 
 
  

Government agencies of the Netherlands
Netherlands